Pinus tecunumanii (syn. Pinus oocarpa var. ochoterenae Martínez; Pinus patula Schiede & Deppe spp. tecunumanii Eguiluz & Perry) is a timber tree native to Mexico and Central America. It grows from the highlands of Chiapas and Oaxaca through Guatemala, Belize, El Salvador, Honduras  to Nicaragua (17° to 14° North latitude). It occurs in two separated populations in their native habitats. The high-altitude group grows at 1500–2900 m, and the low-altitude group at 500–1500 m.

The wood is yellowish.  This species has been cultivated in several subtropical parts of the world for the paper industry. Cultivation trials have shown that high-elevation sources are the most productive. It grows well in Colombia, Venezuela, Brazil and South Africa.

P. tecunumanii was formerly classified as a subspecies of Pinus patula, but DNA analysis has shown that it is a different species, closer to Pinus oocarpa.

References

 Dvorak, W. S., G. R. Hodge, E. A. Gutiérrez, L. F. Osorio, F. S. Malan and T. K. Stanger. 2000. Pinus tecunumanii. In: Conservation and Testing of Tropical and Subtropical Forest Species by the CAMCORE Cooperative. College of Natural Resources, NCSU. Raleigh, NC. USA. pp: 188–209.

External links
  Pinus tecunumanii

tecunumanii
Vulnerable plants
Trees of Mexico
Trees of Guatemala
Trees of Honduras
Trees of Nicaragua
Flora of the Central American pine–oak forests